The Wilfrid Laurier Memorial is a monument to the  seventh Prime Minister of Canada. It is located in Dorchester Square in Downtown Montreal, Quebec, Canada.

Overview 

The Sir Wilfrid Laurier Memorial was constructed in 1953 by Joseph-Émile Brunet on the southern side of Dorchester Square, facing towards the United States. Wilfrid Laurier was a proponent of an early free-trade agreement with the United States and wanted to develop a more continental economic orientation. Also, as Canada's first French Canadian Prime Minister, he faces off against the tribute to Sir John A. Macdonald, across the street in what is now Place du Canada.

Macdonald is enshrined in a stone baldachin emblazoned with copper reliefs of the various agricultural and industrial trades. Laurier stands with the shelter of the massive trees which characterize the square, a granite relief of the provinces created and united under his administrations opposite a bas-relief of man and woman sharing the harvest.

Laurier also stands with his back facing the back of the Boer War Memorial — It was Britain's wish, but Laurier was not prepared to freely commit Canadian troops to Pretoria. The Boer War placed great strains on Laurier's cabinet, because a decision to send troops as required, could also have been construed as Canada's perpetual support to all England's wars. Being the great statesman that Laurier was, he did not wish to alienate Canadian Imperialists and French Canadians.

"Whilst I cannot admit that Canada should take part in all the wars of Great Britain, neither am I prepared to say that she should not take part in any war at all... I claim for Canada this, that in the future, she shall be at liberty to act or not act, to interfere or not interfere, to do just as she pleases." In the end, public demand won through and Canada sent some 7,300 Canadians to South Africa, of which about 1/3 were official contingents.

The Laurier Memorial Committee was founded in 1948 under the auspices of the Canadian Democratic Institute and the Canadian Unity Alliance in order to erect a memorial to Sir Wilfrid Laurier. His inauguration took place on October 12, 1953. The activities of the Monument Committee ended at the end of 1954.

References

External links
 

1953 in Canada
1953 sculptures
History of Montreal
Monuments and memorials in Montreal
Outdoor sculptures in Montreal
Sculptures of men in Canada
Statues in Canada
Wilfrid Laurier
Statues of politicians
Cultural depictions of Canadian men
Cultural depictions of politicians
Dorchester Square